Robert Bruce "Bob" Cochran, M.D. (born December 11, 1951) is a former World Cup alpine ski racer from the United States.

Born in Claremont, New Hampshire, Cochran was a member of the Skiing Cochrans family of Richmond, Vermont. He had one World Cup victory, four podiums, and 21 top ten finishes.  His best finish in the World Cup season standings was in 1973: eighth overall and ninth in slalom.  Cochran also won the combined event at Kitzbühel, Austria, the first win in that event by an American, although not an official World Cup race at the time. His sole World Cup win was in giant slalom, which he considered his weakest event. That win was the first by an American male in a World Cup giant slalom. It was Cochran's only top ten result in giant slalom, his other twenty were evenly split between downhill and slalom.

At the 1972 Winter Olympics in Japan, Cochran finished eighth in the downhill and 17th in the giant slalom, but fell in the slalom. At the World Championships, he placed 14th in the downhill in 1974 in Switzerland, but fell in both the giant slalom and slalom. He was 26th in the downhill in 1970 in Italy.

Cochran last competed in World Cup in 1974, raced the pro tour in North America for several years, then studied medicine at the University of Vermont in Burlington. He graduated in 1981 and became a family practice physician in New Hampshire. His son Jimmy (b. 1981) was also a World Cup racer.

Cochran was inducted into the National Ski Hall of Fame in 2010, joining older sisters Marilyn (1978) and Barbara (1976). He is also a member of the Vermont Sports Hall of Fame with his siblings Marilyn, a fellow 2014 inductee, and Barbara, inducted in 2013.

World Cup results

Season standings

Points were only awarded for top ten finishes (see scoring system).

Race podiums
 1 win – (1 GS)
 4 podiums – (1 DH, 1 GS, 2 SL), and 21 top tens - (10 DH, 1 GS, 10 SL)

Cochran's win in the combined at Kitzbühel in 1973 is omitted because it was notan official World Cup race until two years later. He finished 23rd in the slalom portion to win.

See also
Skiing Cochrans

References

External links
 
 Bob Cochran World Cup standings at the International Ski Federation
 
 
 U.S. Ski & Snowboard Hall of Fame – Bobby Cochran – inducted 2010
 University of Vermont Athletics Hall of Fame – Dr. Robert B. Cochran  – skiing – inducted 1986
 Cheshire Medical Center – Robert B. Cochran, MD
 Vermont Sports Hall of Fame - Bobby Cochran - skiing - inducted in 2014

Olympic alpine skiers of the United States
Alpine skiers at the 1972 Winter Olympics
American male alpine skiers
University of Vermont alumni
Sportspeople from Vermont
Vermont Catamounts skiers
1951 births
Living people